References to George Orwell's 1949 dystopian political novel Nineteen Eighty-Four themes, concepts and plot elements are also frequent in other works, particularly popular music and video entertainment.

References on stage 
A successful new adaptation of Nineteen Eighty-Four (by Robert Icke and Duncan Macmillan), which twice toured the UK and played an extended run in London's West End at the Almeida Theatre and Headlong, have been staged. More recently, a Broadway presentation of the stage adaptation is scheduled to open on 22 June 2017 at the Hudson Theatre.

References in film 
 Near the end of Bedazzled (1967), when Stanley, the character played by Dudley Moore, who has been transformed into a nun, is shown his private room at the convent, he sees a poster above his bed.  On the poster is a photograph of Peter Cook, also dressed as a nun, under which reads the caption, "Big Sister Is Watching You."
 George Lucas's THX 1138 is loosely inspired by 1984, with an underground civilization under heavily surveillance and by containing any form of emotion, including, but not limited to, love.
 Terry Gilliam's Brazil draws heavily from 1984, adding large amounts of dark humour and visual metaphors.
 In Hackers (1995), the character Emmanuel Goldstein says, "1984? That's a typo. Orwell is here now, livin' large. We have no names, no names, man, we are nameless..."
 Me and the Big Guy (1999) is a comedic short film that satires the relationship between Winston and Big Brother by portraying its main character, Citizen 43275-B, entirely grateful of the Revolution and treating his telescreen as if it were his own best friend.
 Equilibrium (2002) portray a futuristic totalitarian dystopian society like we seen in Nineteen Eighty-Four, the structure of these governments (1984 and Equilibrium) is exceedingly similar, with strict social classes and an omnipresent figurehead, known as the “Big Brother” in 1984 and “Father” in Equilibrium. 
 In Eagle Eye (2008), in the beginning of the movie, the quote "Big Brother Is Watching" is used by a reporter in reference to not only 1984, but also to the central theme of the movie: the government being able to tap in and listen to anyone, at any given time.
In Icarus (2017), a documentary about Russia's athletic doping scandal, Grigory Rodchenkov quotes 1984 on several occasions. Rodchenkov compares his situation to that of Winston Smith's and he discusses the concept of "Doublethink."

References on television 
"1984", an Apple Macintosh commercial depicting an Orwellian dystopia, with the image of Big Brother dominating the screen, directed by Ridley Scott.
Good Morning, Mr. Orwell, a made-for-TV art film by Korean American video artist Naim June Paik, is themed after the novel and alludes to it in its name. The project was broadcast on New Year's Day, 1984.
In Are You Being Served? episode "Coffee Morning," the staff are made to fill out a book whenever they have a coffee break or go to the toilet. After they are made aware of the book, Miss Brahms says "Nineteen Eighty-Four: Big Brother Is Watching You," and Mrs. Slocombe replies, "They won't be watching as well will they?"
Reality show Big Brother takes its name from the novel, as does British programme Room 101.
Countdown with Keith Olbermann, a news program on MSNBC, Keith Olbermann often quotes from the novel.  These are usually presented in the "Special Comment" editorial section of the show in reference to current American political debate.  Olbermann often refers to the Fox News Channel as the "Ministry of Truth".
An Important Things with Demetri Martin episode contains a sketch, which parodies the experience of Winston Smith in Room 101
The second episode of the fourth season of 30 Rock, "Into the Crevasse", features a reference to Big Brother. Kenneth Parcell, in addition to working at NBC claims to give his time to several charitable organizations, among them Big Brother. Tina Fey's character Liz Lemon believes him to mean the male half of Big Brothers Big Sisters, but he corrects her saying, "It's an organization that secretly watches people and makes sure they're behaving properly."
The video for Ready, Set, Go! by Tokio Hotel, mostly inspired by the Apple commercial.
 In SCTV'''s "1984:Big Brother" episode, the fictional local TV channel turns into "Telescreen" at the stroke of midnight, January 1, 1984, and its programming (including game shows, children's shows and televangelists) becomes Orwellian; it's revealed to be a nightmare experienced by station manager Edith Prickley.
In episode four of the Greg Davies series Man Down, the pin number shouted by the community police officer is 6079; Winston Smith's citizen number. 
In a television pitch reel for children's television program "Sesame Street", Scoop (the light blue puppet) came up with the title "The Two and Two are Five Show" when Grump (the vermillion-colored puppet) replied: "Are you crazy? This is supposed to be an educational show, two plus two don't make five!" Then Scoop changed the name to "The Two and Two Aren't Five Show". This is a reference to "doublethink".

 In anime 
 Code Geass, a popular mecha anime, gives a subtle reference to the world divisions of 1984.  At the start of the series, the three superpowers (the Holy Britannian Empire, the Chinese Federation, and the European Union) control approximately the same territories as Orwell's three superpowers.
 In the earlier episode of 2012 dystopian science fiction anime series Psycho-Pass, the main antagonist Shougo Makishima can be seen reading the novel. The series itself, like 1984, revolves around surveillance issues of the totalitarian Sibyl System. An advanced governing technology that constantly watches and judged every citizen based on their emotional condition measured by Psycho-Pass score.
 In Kill la Kill, Satsuki Kiryuin's opening line references the novel.
The novel was featured heavily in the Netflix anime series Ghost in the Shell: SAC 2045 where the book belonged to the character Takashi Shimamura.

 References on radio 
"1985", an episode from the fifth season of The Goon Show where 846 Winston Seagoon is a worker for the Big Brother Corporation (a play on the acronym of the British Broadcasting Corporation). Several times during the episode Eccles exclaims "It's good to be alive, in 1985!", and Room 101 becomes the BBC Listening Room, using recordings such as Mrs Dale's Diary for torture.Nineteen Ninety-Four and the sequel series Nineteen Ninety-Eight, written by William Osborne and Richard Turner, is set in the Environment, the country previously known as Britain where 'The Difficulties' of the Nineteen Eighties resulted in the creation of the Department of the Environment (a merger of all government departments and private corporations) and a society built around consumerism, unlimited credit, leisure and 'lifestyle packages'. Edward Wilson, the main character, applies for work at the Department in 1994 (being constantly promoted and then ultimately used as a guinea pig in an experiment to see if mega-markets could replace the Department) and attempts to rouse the population of the Environment against the Am-Jap Corporation in 1998 (his failure to do so resulting in the use of the Environment's population for electricity generation and Wilson becoming a living doll as a present for the CEO's children).

 References in books 
 Anthony Burgess wrote a novel called 1985 that was inspired by 1984 and included essays on Orwell's work.
 György Dalos wrote the novel 1985 that was intended as a direct sequel to Orwell's work.
 Joss Sheldon's second novel, Occupied, was described as "Darker than George Orwell's 1984" by AXS. Sheldon himself has said he was inspired by Orwell when he wrote Occupied.
 In The Areas of My Expertise, in the section on US states, the entry on Indiana mimics Oceania, with the state government being renamed Unigov, Indianapolis being renamed "Speedway One", and the state mottos being phrased in Newspeak.
 In The Dark Tower III: The Waste Lands, Susannah Dean uses Orwell and doublethink to describe the wartime actions of the Old Ones of Lud. One of the inhabitants of Lud is also named Winston.
 In Inventing Elliot by Graham Gardner, the main theme of the book is heavily influenced by 1984, and the key villain of Inventing Elliot models himself on O'Brien, the agent of Big Brother who entraps the hero of 1984.
 The title of Cory Doctorow's Little Brother is a reference to Nineteen Eighty-Four's Big Brother. The novel's main character has the nickname w1n5t0n, a reference to Winston Smith.
 In The Complete Patriot's Guide To Oligarchical Collectivism: Its Theory And Practice, Ethan explores allegories and metaphors of 1984 in nonfiction, and presents examples of real oligarchical institutions.
 The author of The Butterfly and the Flame Dana De Young, references that 1984 as an influence on her writings. In addition to being dystopian literature, The Butterfly and the Flame features several subtle homages to Orwell's work. One of the main characters, Julia La Rouche, was named after Julia in 1984. Aaron and Emily La Rouche stay in a hotel room in Lewis Bend, which is Room 101. Finally, the dedication page features the well known quote, "We'll meet again in a place where there is no darkness."The Butterfly and the Flame, by De Young, Dana published by iUniverse
 In Matthew Reilly's 2011 book Scarecrow and the Army of Thieves the antagonist, Marius Calderon, references the rat torture used to threaten Winston in 1984.
 Japanese author Haruki Murakami's book 1Q84 depicts the world of Japan in the year 1984 through the eyes of two main characters: a reporter and an aspiring writer.
 Margaret Atwood began writing the dystopian novel The Handmaid's Tale in the year 1984.

References in comics
An issue of The Mighty World of Marvel featured a variant of Captain Britain from the world of Nineteen Eighty-Four (Earth-744). This version was named Captain Airstrip One (real name George Smith, a combination of George Orwell and Winston Smith) and was a member of the Thought Police.
In Superman: Red Son, Superman (in this setting the ruler of the Soviet Union) is compared to Big Brother. Additionally, the cover of the third issue was designed in the manner of a poster depicting Superman's head with the caption, "He's watching you".The League of Extraordinary Gentlemen: Black Dossier is set in Britain after the fall of the Big Brother government. In this version it came to power in 1945 (Orwell had wanted to set 1984 in the present day but was asked not to by his publisher), and fell in 1956. This version does not appear to have been as effective as the novel since only two years later Britain has reverted (for the most part) to its pre-Big Brother state. In this version it is explicitly stated that Big Brother was General Harold Wharton, and that Oceania/ Airstrip One was only in control of Britain and lying about controlling anywhere else. O'Brien replaced BB in 1952 and seems to have remained in power until forced into an election by the revived Conservative party in 1956. Miniluv being actually MI5.
 In 1984 Eric Schreurs and Wim Hanssen made the graphic novel 1984: Het Gelijk van George Orwell?, which features two short story comics inspired by the novel and how much of Orwell's predictions have come true? In Schreurs' story Orwell actually comes back from the dead to witness the horrors of modern-day society.Justice Machine takes place on the planet "Georwell" which is later revealed to be Earth in the future after having been taken over by a totalitarian government.
A Peanuts comic strip references 1984, saying that Snoopy is dreading the year 1984 to come because of the jokes that would come along with it.
A Calvin and Hobbes comic strip makes a reference to Thinkpol. Calvin is sitting in class when he shouts that this is "a big, fat waste of my time!" In the fourth panel he is seen trying to run out of the classroom as hands reach out for him and he yells "Help! It's the Thought Police!"

References in popular music

Albums
 David Bowie's 1974 album Diamond Dogs contains five songs inspired by the novel: "We Are the Dead", "Rock 'n' Roll With Me", "Sweet Thing", "1984" and "Big Brother". Bowie originally planned a musical adaptation of the novel as a full-length theatrical production, but the author's late widow, Sonia Brownell, denied him the rights.  A television special which first aired in late 1973 and which featured musical performances by Bowie was jokingly called "The 1980 Floor Show" as a punning reference to Bowie's unsuccessful attempt.
 Rick Wakeman, from Yes released the album 1984 in 1981, to lyrics by Tim Rice. This is a concept album directly based on the novel.
 Subhumans released the album The Day The Country Died in 1982, which appears to be influenced by Nineteen Eighty-Four. One of the songs is called "Big Brother", with lyrics like "There's a TV in my front room and it's screwing up my head", referring to the telescreen of the novel. Much like the novel, the album is largely dystopian, with songs like "Dying World" and "All Gone Dead", the latter of which contains lyrics like "It's 1984 and it's gonna be a war". According to Dick Lucas, the song "Subvert City" is based on the ideas of George Orwell and Aldous Huxley.
 1984 (For the Love of Big Brother) is the title of an album by Eurythmics, which was originally released in November 1984 as a partial soundtrack for the film adaptation.
 Rage Against the Machine released the album called The Battle of Los Angeles in 1999 featuring the track "Testify" containing the phrase "Who Controls the Past Now, Controls the Future, Who controls the Present Now, Controls the Past...", a slogan used by the Party. The entire track "Testify" is arguably an indirect reference to the novel. Also on the same album, the song "Voice of the Voiceless" contains the lyrics "Orwell's hell a terror era coming through, but this little brother is watching you too". The song "Sleep Now in the Fire" states "I'm deep inside your children, they'll betray you in my name," referencing Winston's neighbor.
 Bad Religion released the album called The Empire Strikes First in 2004 featuring the track "Boot Stamping on a Human Face Forever" with the title of the song being a direct reference to the Nineteen Eighty-Four novel. In the novel, O'Brien suggests the image of a boot stamping on a human face forever as a picture of the future. The song seems to be referring to the hopelessness of rebellion against the Party. The lyrics of the title track also states "You don't need to be afraid, you deserve Two Minutes Hate". The lyric book art style is Orwellian themed. During live shows at the time of the release of "The Empire Strikes First," they used a banner with the words "Two Minutes Hate." In their album Suffer, The song "Part II (The Numbers Game)" makes references to the book, with lines such as "Big Brother schemes to rule the nation" and "The government observes with their own electric eye".
 The Dutch synthesizer musician Ed Starink composed and recorded a "Big Brother Suite" in 1983. He remixed that suite in July 1991 in his new digital studio and released it with the album "Retrospection" under his own Star Inc. label. In the liner notes of this album, he explains that "1984" by Orwell inspired him to create a work that was a mixture of the 12-tone system and rhythmical pop influences.
 Progressive metal band Queensrÿche's Operation: Mindcrime is based on 1984.
 Alternative jazz artist Bobby Previte released Coalition of the Willing in 2006 with songs such as "The Ministry of Truth", "Airstrip One", "Ministry of Love", "Oceania", "The Inner Party" and "Memory Hole" inspired by 1984.
 Ex-Genesis guitarist Anthony Phillips released an album called 1984 in 1981.  It was instrumental; the only explicit reference to the book was the open metal cage on the cover of the album.
 The 1998 album Buy Me, I'll Change Your Life by electronic band Snog is loosely based around the novel
 Frontman of Muse, Matt Bellamy, has said that the lyrical themes of their 2009 album The Resistance were inspired by 1984. The title track in particular is a direct reference to 1984 and is about Winston and Julia's secret love relationship. One phrase deliberately elicits 1984 "Kill the prayers for love and peace / you'll wake the thought police / we can't hide the truth inside." Other explicit references include the fourth track of the album, "United States of Eurasia". The song "Citizen Erased" from their previous album Origin of Symmetry also directly references the novel.
 The Alan Parsons Project 1982 album, Eye in the Sky, was inspired on the novel.
 Susumu Hirasawa's "Big Brother" is based upon the underlying themes of Orwell's novel, mostly Big Brother's dominance over the country.
Guitarist Bumblefoot's album Little Brother Is Watching was heavily influenced by Nineteen Eighty-Four.
Industrial Metal group Generation released their album of the same name (which later became known as Brutal Reality) in 1993. The album features explicit references to 1984, including the track titled RM. 101, as well as more implicit references within the other songs. The album cover also depicts the rat mask used in Room 101.

Songs
 the Feederz song 1984 "Will you let it run your life?"
 Oingo Boingo released a song called "Wake up (It's 1984)" on their 1983 album Good For Your Soul. Taking heavily from the movie as well as the book, it serves as commentary to current society.
 Marilyn Manson's album Holy Wood includes a song called "Disposable Teens" in which he sings that he's "a rebel from the waist down". This is a direct reference to Orwell's book, when Winston accuses Julia of being "only a rebel from the waist downwards".  Manson referenced 1984 in a much more explicit manner with "Irresponsible Hate Anthem" from the album, Antichrist Superstar. As well as conforming to the description of the "Hate Song" in Orwell's novel, it begins with the lines "we hate love, we love hate" and includes the spoken line of "History was written by the winners". On the same album, Manson introduces the song, "Minute of Decay", with the words "From a dead man, greetings", which is actually a line from the second film adaptation of 1984.
 Incubus's album A Crow Left of the Murder... includes the song "Talk Show On Mute", about how one day, the television might be watching us instead of us watching them, showing a world where humans are monitored at all times. Among its lyrics is the line: "Come one, come all, into 1984".
 Coldplay's song "Spies" depicts the general society illustrated in 1984 as well as the concept of thoughtcrime (with references to the Thought Police) and lack of freedom. It includes lines such as  "I awake to see that no one is free. We're all fugitives, look at the way we live. Down here, I cannot sleep from fear, no. I said, which way do I turn? I forget everything I learn."  and  "And if we don't hide here, they're going to find us, and if we don't hide now, they're going to catch us when we sleep, and if we don't hide here, they're going to find us." .
 The video for The Pogues' song A Pair of Brown Eyes is set in a Nineteen Eighty-Four-esque Britain, with Margaret Thatcher in place of Big Brother.
 The Aesop Rock song "One Brick" includes the lyric "Platforms have been erected, Effigies built, Slogans coined / songs have been written, Rumors have been circulated, Photographs faked, The hourglass smashed and didn't leave me an escape", most of which is taken directly out of the book. (Page 148 of the Signet Classic Edition)
 Corey Hart's Sunglasses at Night depicts a futuristic surveillance society with Orwellian overtones.
 Cheap Trick's "Dream Police", from the album of the same name, is about a police force who arrests people for illicit thoughts, much like thoughtcrime.
 Russian band Louna released a song titled "1984", which heavily references the book.
 The Bitter End by Placebo also contains various references to the book.
 The first verse of the song "Metaphysics of the Hangman" by German progressive metal band The Ocean, makes explicit reference to the novel as part of a larger critique on Christianity: "On their long journey that leads them toward the light, Winston Smith shall be their guide. They're trying so hard to believe, that two and two always makes five."The song "Keep the Car Running" by the indie rock band Arcade Fire describes a man living in a totalitarian society and contains allusions to 1984.
The song "Two Minutes of Hate" by the metalcore band SHVPES refers to the daily event of the same name.
Bastille references the novel in their song "Back to the Future", the fifth track on their 2022 album Give Me the Future, in the lyrics, "Feels like we danced into a nightmare/We're living 1984/If doublethink's no longer fiction/We'll dream of Huxley's Island shores."
 The song “Unperson” by the English band Nothing But Thieves is named after, and mentions, the Newspeak word “unperson”, as well as mentioning “doublethink”. These are shown in the lyrics, “‘Cause I’m another unperson / You created this mess / You are the grand designer / Revel in our unrest” along with, “And we’re getting sick of your doublethink / We see you all and now the walls are cavin’ in / And maybe I’m flawed, but I do exist / My thoughts are mine, I didn’t sign up for this”. The end of the song also has the lyrics, “I’m just another clone of a clone of a clone”. 

Big Brother
 In the Black Sabbath album Sabbath Bloody Sabbath, the song "Who Are You? shows Big Brother's ignorance. He believes that all the people worship him blindly, instead of understanding his true intentions. The protagonist represents, the brighter people, such as Winston Smith, who refuse to stay blind to Big Brother's actions. Big Brother treats his subjects as subordinates. "Yes, I know the secret/That’s within your mind/You think all the people/Who worship you are blind/You’re just like Big Brother/Giving us your trust/And when you have played enough/You’ll just cast our souls/Into the dust/Into the dust." As a result, the narrator does not worship or respect Big Brother, as do the rest of the citizens. He wants to learn of his identity. "You thought that it would be easy/From the very start/Now I’ve found you out/I don’t think you’re so smart/I only have one more question/Before my time is through/Please, I beg you, tell me/In the name of hell/Who are you?" The song was written by vocalist Ozzy Osbourne, "I’d written it one night at Bulrush Cottage while I was loaded and fiddling around with a Revox tape machine and my ARP 2600." 
 In John Lennon's 1973 quasi-protest song "Only People", he repeatedly sings the line "We don't want no Big Brother scene..."
 The Rare Earth hit single "Hey Big Brother", released in 1971, sings of the future arrival of Big Brother, first addressing this future Big Brother directly and then finishing by expressing a rebellious defiance against his arrival.
 The Dead Kennedys' 1979 single "California über alles" contains the lyrics "Big Bro on white horse is near", and also "Now it is 1984 / Knock knock at your front door / It's the suede-denim secret police / They've come for your uncool niece" in reference to the thought police of the novel. Another reference to the book can be found in the song "We've got a bigger problem now" on the album In God We Trust, Inc.. The lyrics "Close your mind/ its time for the two minute warning/ Welcome to 1984 are you ready for the third world war/ You too will meet the secret police".
 The second album, What Will the Neighbours Say? by British band Girls Aloud contained the track "Big Brother" which features the line "Big Brother's watching me and I don't really mind".
 Anaïs Mitchell's song "1984" contains various references to Big Brother, vast files on a person's activities, the house being bugged, a USA Patriot Act and reporting people to the government.
 The Austin Lounge Lizards' song "1984 Blues" is a stereotypical blues song, in which the singer describes how he "met (his) baby / in the Ministry of Love", how "Big Brother is watching / watching on the telescreen", and how he tells "Mister Thought Policeman" that he "don't wanna do no wrong".
 On the 1972 Stevie Wonder album Talking Book, there is a track entitled "Big Brother", which opens "Your name is Big Brother./ You say that you're watching me on the telly/ Seeing me go nowhere."
 During the performances of "Mother" by Roger Waters on his 2010-2012 tour of The Wall, the phrase "Big Brother is watching you" is a graffiti-like graphic showing on the projections onto the wall on-stage, only with the word "Brother" defaced with "Mother".

Winston Smith
 English indie band Dogs have a song named "Winston Smith"
 Utopia's album Oblivion contained a track entitled "Winston Smith Takes It On The Jaw" based on novel's main character
 The Paul Weller penned song "Standards," performed by The Jam on their 1977 album This Is the Modern World, loosely echoes the themes of the novel culminating in the lyric "Look, you know what happened to Winston!"

Newspeak
 Open Hand released a song called "Newspeak" on their 2005 album You and Me. The song title and lyrics deal heavily with the ideas of newspeak and being thought controlled.

2 plus 2 equals 5
 Radiohead's song "Karma Police" references the Thought Police. Their song "2 + 2 = 5", from the 2003 album Hail to the Thief, is inspired in part by the Dante's Inferno and Nineteen Eighty-Four.
 In the song "George Orwell Must Be Laughing His Ass Off" by Mea Culpa, the second verse begins with "If 2 plus 2 don't equal 5, I guess I'm just no fun".
 Singer/songwriter Jonatha Brooke published a song called "When Two and Two are Five" with Jennifer Kimball (as The Story).
 Sage Francis references "Big Brotherly love" and declares, "Don’t forget what two plus two equals" in the political song "Hey Bobby".
 Living Colour's Cult of Personality describes directing people to believe that "one and one makes three".
 On Victims of the Modern Age, the 2010 album from Arjen Lucassen's Star One project, the song "Two Plus Two Equals Five" is based on 1984.
In the television series Star Trek: The Next Generation, in the two-part episode entitled Chain of Command, Captain Jean-Luc Picard is captured by an enemy species known as Cardassian.  During the ensuing torture sequences, he is shown four lights and the Cardassian captor Gul Madred repeatedly inflicts punishment on Picard every time he fails to agree that there are five lights rather than four.  Similarly, in Nineteen Eighty Four, Winston Smith is tortured by O'Brien of the Thought Police with "How many fingers do you see?" while holding up four, and the correct answer is "five."

George Orwell
 CANO's 1978 album Eclipse contains the song "Bienvenue 1984", which contains references to the novel and George Orwell. The song's lyrics present a dystopian reality of economic failures and ethnic strife.
 Anti-Flag released a song called "Welcome to 1984", in which the band talks about the book in various ways, such as, "Mr. Orwell from the grave, adding fresh ink to the page" and "The double talk is past surreal". An acoustic version of this song appears on Punk Goes Acoustic 2.
 German band BAP referred to Orwell and 1984 in their live recording of the song "Ne schöne Jrooß" on their 1983 live album "Bess demnähx": "Leven Orwell, vierunachzig ess noh, ess mittlerweile nur noch een läppsch Johr" (Cologne dialect for "Dear Orwell, '84 is near, meanwhile it's only one more shabby year to go"). In concerts after 1984, they replaced the second verse with "Ess mittlerweile leider vill ze vill wohr" ("Unfortunately, much too much has meanwhile become reality").
 Propagandhi's 1993 album How To Clean Everything features a song titled "Head? Chest? or Foot?", stating "I'd rather be in prison in a George Orwellian world, than your pacified society of happy boys and girls." in the final verse. The band also contributed a song titled "War is Peace, Slavery is Freedom, May All Your Interventions Be Humanitarian" to the Fat Wreck Chords compilation Live Fat, Die Young.
 Our Lady Peace's album Spiritual Machines contained a track entitled "R.K. 1949" where the narrator states, "The year is 1949, George Orwell portrays the chilling world in which computers are used by large bureaucracies to monitor and enslave the population in his book Nineteen Eighty-Four."
 UK rap artist Jehst makes a number of references to 1984 in his lyrics "2004, its more like 1984 right here right now" and "Its 1984!” in songs with a strong political edge, he also makes reference to "Orwellian Prophecies", Thought Police and Big Brother.

Samples from Nineteen Eighty-Four
 Judas Priest's song "Electric Eye" contains references to Big Brother, and specifically telescreens: "I take a pride in probing all your secret moves", "I am perpetual, I keep the country clean", "There is no true escape, I'm watching all the time"
 Manic Street Preachers released the album The Holy Bible in 1994, which contains the song "Faster". At the beginning of the song a voice (John Hurt, sampled from Nineteen Eighty-Four) quotes a line from the book, although not word for word: "I hate purity. I hate goodness. I don't want virtue to exist anywhere. I want everyone corrupt."  They also had a track called "1985", in which they make various references to the novel, such as "In 1985, Orwell was proved right".
 Ministry's song "Faith Collapsing", from the album The Mind Is A Terrible Thing To Taste, consists almost entirely of samples from Nineteen Eighty-Four.
 Skinny Puppy uses samples from Nineteen Eighty-Four in "The Centre Bullet", "I don't mean confessing. Confessing isn't betrayal. I mean feelings. If they can make me change my feelings, if they can stop me from loving you, that would be real betrayal." and also in "Carry" from the album "Back And Forth 3 & 4"
El-P on his 2002 album Fantastic Damage used samples from Nineteen Eighty-Four in the song "Accidents Don't Happen" featuring Cage and Camu Tao, such as "If you want a vision of the future...imagine a boot stamping on a human face" and "Power is not a means, it's an end. In our world, there will only be triumph and self-effacement. Everything else we shall destroy". All of which are from the dialogue between Winston and O'Brien in Room 101.
 Butcher Babies released the album Lilith in 2017, which contains the song "Burn the Straw Man". At the beginning of the song a voice speaks the line "If you want a vision of the future, imagine a boot stamping on a human face - Forever".

 References in video games 
 In Capcom's Strider series the titular protagonist fights against a totalitarian regime in a dystopian setting. The term Eurasia is used in referring to the Kazakh Soviet Socialist Republic.
 In the Sanctuary Woods CD-ROM game "Victor Vector & Yondo: The Cyberplasm Formula", there are references to "Victory Cola" and "Victory Coffee". 1984-themed graffiti can be found in several scenes including "2+2=5" and "doubleplusgood". In addition, one scene features a door marked "101", next to which is the graffiti, "The worst thing in the world". If the player clicks on the doorbell next to the door, it falls off and a rat can be heard squeaking.
In the PC game SimCity Societies, the Authoritarian society is slightly based on Nineteen Eighty-Four, with a Ministry of Truth, Justice Palace, and, among other items, gigantic television screens displaying a bald man who has an uncanny resemblance to the Big Brother of the movie based on the novel.
The world of Half-Life 2 is similar to that of the novel, featuring giant broadcasting screens that show the face of the tyrant dictator who controls the world in which they live, and omnipresent police. The living quarters are similar to the Victory Mansions where Winston lives, and there are small hovering cameras that are used for watching residents in these apartments. A torture room named "Room 101" is also seen at the beginning of the game. Also, citizens are forced to wear blue denim overalls, just like in Nineteen Eighty Four. Recently, when Valve announced that Steam was available to Mac users, they recreated the 1984 Mac advertisement, using characters from Half-Life 2.
Ken Levine, creator of the highly acclaimed FPS BioShock, said that 1984 along with Ayn Rand's Atlas Shrugged was an influence on the game's storyline. The "little sisters" are also a direct reference to "Big Brother." In Bioshock 2 in several places you can find written on the walls, "Big Sister is watching you."
In Call of Duty: Modern Warfare 2, there is a challenge that requires you to call in 3 UAV surveillance drones in a single match. Completion of this challenge will earn the "Big Brother" title, a reference to Big Brother and the Party's constant surveillance of the people.
In Fallout 3, the protagonist's supposed place of origin, Vault 101, draws many references from 1984, such as a cult of personality surrounding the director of the vault, the overseer. The Vault's name itself is in reference to the torture room '101' as well as a good portion of the security personnel being brutish and corrupt. In the Overseer's office you find files detailing most of the individuals in the Vault.Batman: Arkham City has many interesting references to 1984. An example are the signs that force authority in the prison. One of the signs even has Hugo Strange look similar to Big Brother. Also, if you turn the Arkham City's symbol upside down, it looks remarkably similar to Ingsoc's symbol.
In The Elder Scrolls III: Morrowind within the city of Vivec there's a 'Ministry of Truth' a direct reference to the place Winston forges history for the Party as well as the questions you are asked initially when creating a character with question four; There is a lot of heated discussion at the local tavern over a grouped of people called 'Telepaths'. They have been hired by certain City-State kings. Rumor has it these Telepaths read a person's mind and tell their lord whether a follower is telling the truth or not. With the answers: This is a terrible practice. A person's thoughts are his own and no one, not even a king, has the right to make such an invasion into another human's mind. Loyal followers to the king have nothing to fear from a Telepath. It is important to have a method of finding assassins and spies before it is too late. In these times, it is a necessary evil. Although you do not necessarily like the idea, a Telepath could have certain advantages during a time of war or in finding someone innocent of a crime. It should also be noted that the buildings in Vivec are pyramid shaped a very notable feature of the 1984 Ministries.
In the Ubisoft game; Anno 2070 for the corporate faction the 'Tycoons' their information need is met by building large towers known as a 'Ministry of Truth' channels over time become available by unlocking new levels of society and population status these channels include: 'Global Trust - We look after you', 'Job TV', 'Success Stories', 'Neighborhood Watch' and 'Immo TV - Your Property' similar to the propaganda described in 1984 with their own icons and video loops.
In the U.K independent Chucklefish game Starbound, the race known as the Apex takes part of their culture from the 1984 book as referenced here in the trivia as "Apex lore is riddled with references to the dystopian classic 1984 by George Orwell. Features such as MiniKnog and "Big Ape" are obvious allusions to the Ministries of Ingsoc (Ministry of Truth being Minitrue, Ministry of Love being Miniluv, etc.), and Big Brother being a considerable presence in 1984." There are also interrogation tables one can find in Apex bases, televisions that watch you, and posters and guards that state "Big Ape is watching you"
The Konami game Metal Gear Solid V: The Phantom Pain is heavily influenced by 1984, Moby-Dick and Lord of the Flies. Ocelot and Big Boss refer to the concepts of "doublethink" and "2+2=5" after discussing the act of self-hypnosis, realizing the year (ingame) is 1984. Torture and interrogations are conducted in "Room 101". Skull Face, the game's main antagonist, proclaims "This War is Peace." After the conclusion of Chapter 1, posters declaring "Big Boss is Watching You" appear throughout the Diamond Dogs Motherbase.
The Ubisoft game Tom Clancy's Rainbow Six Siege  The GIGN operator Lion has a gadget called the EE-ONE-D, a drone present at all times above the map, when activated it scans the area for a short period, if a defender moves their position is compromised. when activating this he can say the voice line "big brother incoming" or "big brother coming in for overwatch" in reference to its omnipresence and suppressive ability
The Epic Games game Fortnite had a pre-game introduction which was a parody of Apple's 1984 Macintosh computer advertisement called "Nineteen Eighty-Fortnite" .This was made in response to Apple removing Fortnite from their App Store which Epic Games later called "anti-competitive restrictions" on September 10th 2020. Epic games would also later file a lawsuit against apple due to these practices.
Upon Minecraft'' releasing a controversial moderation feature in update version 1.19.1, in which players could report other players for in-game chat messages, players dubbed the update "1.19.84".

References

 
Novels in popular culture